The Chattanooga Choo-Choos were a minor league Negro league baseball team based in Chattanooga, Tennessee.  The team was a member of the Negro Southern League, which was considered a minor league for the duration of the Choo-Choos' affiliation, and fielded a team from  until .  The Choo-Choos played their home games at Engel Stadium.  The team is noted as the first professional baseball organization for which Hall of Famer Willie Mays played.

References

Negro league baseball teams
Sports in Chattanooga, Tennessee
Professional baseball teams in Tennessee
Baseball teams established in 1940
Sports clubs disestablished in 1946
1940 establishments in Tennessee
1946 disestablishments in Tennessee
Defunct baseball teams in Tennessee
Baseball teams disestablished in 1946